Jose Francisco Rodriguez Tamayo (born 10 July 1993) is a Mexican professional boxer. He is a former unified mini flyweight world champion, having held the WBO title from March to December 2014 and the IBF title from August to October 2014. Rodríguez Jr. is also a one-time light flyweight title challenger, having fought for the WBO title in 2015, and one-time super flyweight title challenger, having fought for the WBO title in 2021.

Professional career

Unified mini flyweight champion

Rodríguez Jr. vs. Sabillo
His 16–2 record earned Rodríguez Jr. the right to challenge the undefeated WBO mini flyweight champion Merlito Sabillo in what was the Sabillo's third title defense. The title bout was scheduled as the main event of a card which took place at the Monterrey Arena in Monterrey, Mexico on 22 March 2014. He won the fight by a tenth-round technical knockout. Rodríguez Jr. knocked Sabillo down with a flurry of punches as early as the second round and continued to dominate from that point on. Sabillo's head trainer Edito Villamor opted to throw in the towel at the 1:50 minute of the tenth round, having deemed his fighter to have taken too much punishment.

Rodríguez Jr. vs. Takayama
Rodríguez Jr. faced the IBF mini flyweight champion Katsunari Takayama in a unification bout in his next professional appearance. The contest took place in the same venue as his previous title fight, the Monterrey Arena in Monterrey, Mexico, on 9 August 2014. It was broadcast by TV Azteca domestically and by beIN Sports in the United States. Rodríguez Jr. won the fight by unanimous decision, with scores of 119–108, 116–111 and 115–112. He scored the sole knockdown of the fight in the third round, flooring Takayama with a left hook. The fight was later named the "2014 Fight of the Year" by Bleacher Report, Boxing Scene, and ESPN.

Rodríguez Jr. vacated the IBF title on 1 October 2014 and the WBO title on 15 December 2014. His promoters claimed that he had vacated the title as was struggling to meet the 105-lbs mark, saying: "...basically, since he was struggling to make 105 pounds, he’s looking to make his mark at the higher weight now".

Light flyweight and flyweight

Rodríguez Jr. vs. Fajardo
After vacating his IBF title, but before vacating the WBO title as well, Rodríguez Jr. moved up to flyweight in order to face the unheralded Jomar Fajardo. The bout was scheduled for the undercard of "Pinoy Pride 28", which was headlined by a light flyweight title bout between Donnie Nietes and Carlos Velarde, and which took place at the Waterfront Hotel & Casino in Cebu City, Philippines on 15 November 2014. Fajardo stepped in as a late notice replacement for Virgilio Silvano. Despite coming into the fight as a significant favorite, Rodríguez  failed to win the bout, as it ended in a split decision draw. One judge scored the fight 96–94 for Fajardo, the second judge scored it 98–92 for Rodríguez, while the third judge scored it as an even 95–95 draw.

An immediate rematch was booked for 31 January 2015. It took place at the Palenque de la Feria in Tuxtla Gutiérrez, Mexico. Rodríguez Jr. won the fight by unanimous decision, with scores of 100–92, 97–92 and 99–90.

Rodríguez Jr. vs. Nietes
On 3 June 2015, it was revealed that Rodríguez Jr. would challenge the reigning WBO and The Ring light flyweight champion Donnie Nietes. The fight headlined a beIN Sports and ABS-CBN broadcast card, that took place on 11 July 2015 in Nietes' native Philippines. Nietes retained the titles by unanimous decision, with scores of 118–110, 119–109 and 115–113.

Super flyweight

Title run
After failing to capture the WBO flyweight title, Rodríguez Jr. moved up to super flyweight. He faced the former WBO light flyweight champion Ramón García Hirales, in his first fight at super flyweight, on 20 February 2016. He won the fight by unanimous decision, with scores of 99–89, 99–88 and 96–91. Rodríguez knocked Hirales down twice in the seventh round and once in the eight round, although he was unable to finish him.

Rodríguez Jr. next faced Johnny Michel Garcia in a tune-up fight on 23 July 2016. He won the fight by a fifth-round technical knockout. He was leading on all three of the judges' scorecards at the time of the stoppage, with scores of 50–45, 50–45 and 49–46. Rodríguez Jr. was booked to face Crison Omayao on 29 October 2016, at the Palenque Vicente Fernandez in Gomez Palacio, Mexico. He knocked Omayao down once in the fourth round, before knocking him out in the fifth round.

Rodríguez Jr. faced Hajime Nagai on 4 February 2017, in his first fight of the year. He won the fight by technical decision, with all three judges scoring the bout 50–43 in his favor. The fight was stopped at the 1:22 minute mark of the fifth round, as Nagai was unable to continue due to a eye swelling and watering caused by an accidental elbow strike.

Rodríguez Jr. was next booked to face the undefeated Elias Joaquino on 12 August 2017. He won the fight by a seventh-round knockout, after having knocked Joaquino down once in the seventh round. He was leading at the time of the stoppage, with all three judges' having scored the fight 70–61 in his favor.

Rodríguez Jr. faced the 60-fight veteran Ronald Ramos on 16 December 2017. He had a great start to the fight, knocking Ramos in the very first round, and won the fight by a sixth-round technical knockout.

Rodríguez Jr. faced the former Japanese super flyweight champion and one time WBO Asia Pacific and OPBF title challenger Yohei Tobe on 9 June 2018, for the vacant WBC Latino Silver Super Flyweight belt. He knocked Tobe down twice by the 2:33 minute mark of the second round, prompting Tobe's corner to throw in the towel.

Rodríguez Jr. faced the former WBA flyweight champion and one-time interim super flyweight title challenger Hernán Márquez on 20 October 2018. He won the fight by a third-round technical knockout. Rodríguez knocked Márquez with a short left cross 30 seconds into the third round, which didn't leave his opponent visibly hurt as he was able to beat the ten-count. Rodríguez floored Márquez down with another left cross in the final minute of the round, which left him unable to rise from the canvas.  Referee Florentino Lopez decided to wave the fight off at the 2:10 minute mark, without administering the full ten-count.

Rodríguez Jr. faced fellow former mini flyweight champion Oswaldo Novoa on 6 April 2019. He won the fight by a narrow unanimous decision, with all three judges scoring the bout 95–94 in his favor.

Rodríguez Jr. faced the undefeated David Barreto on 1 June 2019, who entered the fight on a 12-fight winning streak. He won the fight by a second-round stoppage, as Barreto's corner chose to retire their fighter at the end of the round.

Following a third-round stoppage of William Riera on 26 October 2019, Rodríguez Jr. was booked to face Jose Maria Cardenas on 30 November 2019, with the vacant WBC Latino super flyweight title on the line. He won the fight by a sixth-round technical knockout.

Rodríguez Jr. vs Ioka
On 2 December 2020, it was revealed that Rodríguez Jr. would challenge the reigning WBC super flyweight champion Julio Cesar Martinez. The fight was expected to take place on the undercard of the Canelo Álvarez and Callum Smith super middleweight title bout, which took place on 19 December 2020 at the Alamodome in San Antonio, Texas. Martinez withdrew from the fight on 10 December, due to a non-COVID-19 related illness.

On 1 June 2021, the WBO ordered their reigning champion Kazuto Ioka to face Rodríguez Jr., who was at the time the #2 ranked super flyweight contender, in a mandatory title defense. The pair came to terms three weeks later, on 21 June, therefore successfully avoiding a purse bid. The fight was scheduled to take place on 1 September 2021, at the Ota City General Gymnasium in Tokyo, Japan. Ioka won the fight by unanimous decision, with all three judges scoring the fight 116–112 in his favor.

Later super flyweight career
After his second failed title bid, Rodríguez Jr. moved up to bantamweight. He faced Arnulfo Salvador Rodriguez on 14 January 2022. Rodríguez Jr. won the fight by a seventh-round technical knockout. Rodríguez Jr. returned to super flyweight to face Erick Omar Lopez on 16 July 2022. He won the fight by a unanimous decision.

Rodríguez Jr. faced the WBO flyweight champion Junto Nakatani in a super flyweight non-title bout on 1 November 2022, on the undercard of the Hiroto Kyoguchi and Kenshiro Teraji title unification bout. He lost the fight by unanimous decision, with scores of 98–91, 97–92 and 99–90. Rodríguez Jr. was deducted a point in the seventh round for landing a low blow.

Professional boxing record

See also
List of minimumweight boxing champions
List of WBO world champions
List of IBF world champions
List of Mexican boxing world champions

References

External links

Boxers from Nuevo León
Sportspeople from Monterrey
Mini-flyweight boxers
Light-flyweight boxers
Flyweight boxers
Super-flyweight boxers
1993 births
Living people
Mexican male boxers
21st-century Mexican people